Witkin is a surname. Notable people with the surname include:

Andrew Witkin (1952–2010), American computer scientist who made major contributions in computer vision and computer graphics
Beatrice Witkin (1916-1990), American composer and pianist
Bernard E. Witkin (1904–1995), founder of the California law treatise Witkin's
Brian Witkin, founder and former president of Pacific Records
Christian Witkin (born 1966), New York-based fashion and portrait photographer
Evelyn M. Witkin (born 1921), American geneticist whose research has been widely influential in DNA mutagenesis and DNA repair
Herman Witkin (1916–1979), American psychologist who specialized in the spheres of cognitive psychology and learning psychology
Isaac Witkin (1936–2006), internationally renowned modern sculptor, was born in Johannesburg, South Africa
Jerome Witkin (born 1939), American figurative artist whose paintings often deal with political and cultural themes
Joel-Peter Witkin (born 1939), American photographer who lives in Albuquerque, New Mexico
Morton Witkin (1895–1973), American lawyer and politician

Slavic-language surnames
Jewish surnames